Francis Raymond Walsh, M. Afr., (15 September 1901– 27 October 1974) was a Roman Catholic clergyman who served as the Bishop of Aberdeen from 1951 to 1963.

Born in Cirencester, Gloucestershire, England on 15 September 1901, he was educated at Fordyce Academy, Banffshire, Blairs College, Aberdeen, and the Scots College in Rome.

Walsh was ordained a priest on 7 March 1925. He was professed a member of the Missionaries of Africa on 9 September 1931. He was appointed the Bishop of the Diocese of Aberdeen by the Holy See on 20 June 1951, and consecrated to the Episcopate on 12 September 1951. The principal consecrator was Archbishop Donald Alphonsus Campbell, and the principal co-consecrators were Bishop James Black and Bishop (later Archbishop) James Donald Scanlan. He attended the first session of the Second Vatican Council in 1962.

He resigned as Bishop of Aberdeen on 22 July 1963. He was appointed Titular Bishop of Birtha on 12 September 1963, but resigned the title on 7 December 1970. He died in Grantham on 27 October 1974, aged 73.

References 

1901 births
1974 deaths
Bishops of Aberdeen
People educated at Fordyce Academy
People from Cirencester
People from Grantham
20th-century Roman Catholic bishops in Scotland
English Roman Catholic bishops